Cajun cuisine is a style of cooking developed by the Cajun–Acadians who were deported from Acadia to Louisiana during the 18th century and who incorporated West African, French and Spanish cooking techniques into their original cuisine. 

Cajun cuisine is sometimes referred to as a 'rustic cuisine', meaning that it is based on locally available ingredients and that preparation is relatively simple.

An authentic Cajun meal is usually a three-pot affair, with one pot dedicated to the main dish, one dedicated to steamed rice, specially made sausages, or some seafood dish, and the third containing whatever vegetable is plentiful or available. Crawfish, shrimp, and andouille sausage are staple meats used in a variety of dishes.

The aromatic vegetables green bell pepper, onion, and celery are called "the trinity" by chefs in Cajun and Louisiana Creole cuisines. Roughly diced and combined in cooking, the method is similar to the use of the mirepoix in traditional French cuisine which blends roughly diced carrot, onion, and celery. Additional characteristic aromatics for both the Creole and Cajun versions may include parsley, bay leaf, thyme, green onions, ground cayenne pepper, and ground black pepper. Cayenne and Louisiana-style hot sauce are the primary sources of spice in Cajun cuisine, which usually tends towards a moderate, well-balanced heat, despite the national "Cajun hot" craze of the 1980s and 1990s.

History

The Acadians were a group of French colonists who lived in Acadia, what is today Eastern Canada. In the mid-18th century, they were deported from Acadia by the British during the French and Indian War in what they termed le Grand Dérangement, and many of them ended up settling in Southern Louisiana. 

Due to the extreme change in climate, Acadians were unable to cook their original dishes. Soon, their former culinary traditions were adapted and, in time, incorporated not only Indigenous American traditions, but also African-American traditions—as is exemplified in the classic Cajun dish "Gumbo", which is named for its principal ingredient (Okra) using the West African name for that very ingredient: "Gumbo," in West Africa, means "Okra". 

Many other meals developed along these lines, adapted in no small part from Haiti, to become what is now considered classic Cajun cuisine traditions  (not to be confused with the more modern concept associated with Prudhomme's style). 

Up through the 20th century, the meals were not elaborate but instead, rather basic. The public's false perception of "Cajun" cuisine was based on Prudhomme's style of Cajun cooking, which was spicy, flavorful, and not true to the classic form of the cuisine. 

Cajun and Creole cuisine have been mistaken to be the same, but the origins of Creole cooking began in New Orleans, and Cajun cooking came 40 years after the establishment of New Orleans. Today, most restaurants serve dishes that consist of Cajun styles, which Paul Prudhomme dubbed "Louisiana cooking". In home-cooking, these individual styles are still kept separate. However, there are fewer and fewer people cooking the classic Cajun dishes that would have been eaten by the original settlers.

Cajun cooking methods
Barbecuing—similar to "low and slow" Southern barbecue traditions, but with Creole/Cajun seasoning. A classic example is Johnson's Boucaniere ("smokehouse") in Lafayette, which was named best barbecue in Louisiana by the Food Network in July 2022. In the Ville Platte area, a unique sauce is made from dried onions reconstituted in water and vegetable oil thick with ketchup, mustard, Worcestershire sauce, and seasonings. The flavorful oil that rises to the top is applied directly to meats being cooked as a baste. Two popular brands are Jack Miller's and Pig Stand, which are available online and in grocery stores across the state. This sauce is also commonly used on hamburgers, hot dogs, pork chops, chicken, and other grilled items. 
Baking—direct and indirect dry heat in a furnace or oven, faster than smoking but slower than grilling
Grilling—direct heat on a shallow surface, fastest of all variants; sub-variants include:
Charbroiling—direct dry heat on a solid surface with wide raised ridges
Gridironing—direct dry heat on a solid or hollow surface with narrow raised ridges
Griddling—direct dry or moist heat along with the use of oils and butter on a flat surface
Braising—combining a direct dry heat charbroil-grill or gridiron-grill with a pot filled with broth for direct moist heat, faster than smoking but slower than regular grilling and baking; time starts fast, slows down, then speeds up again to finish
Boiling—as in boiling of crabs, crawfish, or shrimp, in seasoned liquid, often with side items like corn on the cob, whole new potatoes, and mushrooms cooked in the same boiling pot. A seafood boil is often a large outdoor social event.
Deep frying—lightly breaded and fried seafood including various fish, shrimp, oysters, and soft-shell crab is universally popular in Cajun cuisine, often on French bread po-boys in the New Orleans style, along with traditional Southern favorites like fried chicken, okra, and pork chops.
Smothering—cooking a vegetable or meat over low heat with the sauteed "trinity," plus small amounts of water or stock, similar to braising. This forms a pan sauce or gravy, and the finished product is served over rice. Étouffée is a popular variant done with crawfish or shrimp. A meatless version might feature mushrooms and eggplant. Two commonly smothered meats are pork chops and round steak; these heartier meats may sometimes have a bit of roux added to the gravy.
Pan-broiling or pan-frying
Injecting—using a large syringe-type setup to place seasoning deep inside large cuts of meat; this technique is much newer than the others on this list, but very common in Cajun cuisine

Deep-frying of turkeys or oven-roasted turduckens entered southern Louisiana cuisine more recently. Also, blackening of fish or chicken and barbecuing of shrimp in the shell are excluded because they were not prepared in traditional Cajun cuisine. Blackening was actually an invention by chef Paul Prudhomme in the 1970s, becoming associated with Cajun cooking, and presented as such by him, but is not a true historical or traditional Cajun cooking process.

Ingredients
The following is a partial list of ingredients used in Cajun cuisine and some of the staple ingredients of the Acadian food culture.

Grains
Corn
Rice
Scotch barley
Wheat—for baking bread

Fruits and vegetables

Bell peppers (green or red)
Blackberries
Cayenne peppers
Celery (seed, leaf and stalk)
Collard greens
Cucumbers
Figs
Leek
Limes
Lemons
Mirlitons (chayotes or vegetable pears)
Muscadines
Okra
Onions
Parsnip
Parsley
Pecans
Satsuma oranges
Scallions (green onions or onion tops)
Squash
Strawberries
Sweet potatoes
Tabasco pepper
Tomatoes

Meat and seafood
Cajun foodways include many ways of preserving meat, some of which are waning due to the availability of refrigeration and mass-produced meat at the grocer. Smoking of meats remains a fairly common practice, but once-common preparations such as turkey or duck confit (preserved in poultry fat, with spices) are now seen even by Acadians as quaint rarities.

Game (and hunting) are still uniformly popular in Acadiana.

The recent increase of catfish farming in the Mississippi Delta has brought about an increase in its usage in Cajun cuisine in the place of the more traditional wild-caught trout (the saltwater species).

Seafood
Freshwater 
Bass 
Catfish
Sac-à-lait (white perch or crappie)
Yellow perch
Saltwater or brackish water species
Trout
Redfish
Pompano
Drumfish
Flounder
Grouper
Perch—many varieties
Snapper—many varieties
Shellfish
Crawfish (ecrevisse)—either wild swamp or farm-raised
Shrimp, or crevette (chevrette in Louisiana French)
Oysters
Blue crab
Also included in the seafood mix are some so-called trash fish that would not sell at market because of their high bone to meat ratio or required complicated cooking methods. These were brought home by fishermen to feed the family. Examples are garfish, black drum also called gaspergou or just "goo", croaker, and bream.

Poultry
Farm-raised
Turkey (and turkey confit)
Chicken (and guinea hen)
Game birds
Dove
Duck (and duck confit)
Goose
Quail
Pork
Andouille—a spicy smoked pork sausage, characterized by a coarse-ground texture and large-diameter casing.
Boudin—a cooked sausage made with green onions, pork, and rice, and usually a large amount of ground pork or chicken livers. Boudin may be thought of as "dirty rice in a casing." Some locals prefer to eat the sausage with the casing on, while others squeeze the contents out. Boudin filling is completely cooked before being stuffed into casings and may be consumed immediately after purchase, although it is also popularly grilled at cookouts. Pork blood is sometimes added to produce boudin rouge. Other versions can contain seafood, such as crawfish.
Chaurice, a sausage similar to Spanish chorizo
Chaudin or ponce—a pig's stomach, stuffed with spiced pork & smoked.
Ham hocks
Wild boar or feral hog
Head cheese
Gratons—hog cracklings or pork rinds; fried, seasoned pork fat & skin, sometimes with small bits of meat attached. Similar to Spanish chicharrones.
 Hot link sausage
Pork sausage (fresh)—distinctively seasoned and usually smoked, this sausage is often used in gumbos as is andouille, but it may also be grilled or pan-cooked to produce a rice and gravy dish. The sausage itself does not include rice, separating it from boudin. In Cajun country, a distinction exists between this sausage, which is simply called "pork sausage," is finer ground, and uses smaller pork casings, and the similar andouille, which has a coarser grind and larger beef casings.
Salt pork
Tasso—a highly seasoned, smoked pork shoulder of the Choctaw

Beef and dairy
Though parts of Acadiana are well suited to cattle or dairy farming, beef is not often used in a pre-processed or uniquely Cajun form. It is usually prepared fairly simply as chops, stews, or steaks, taking a cue from Texas to the west. Ground beef is used as is traditional throughout the US, although seasoned differently.

Dairy farming is not as prevalent as in the past, but there are still some farms in the business. There are no unique dairy items prepared in Cajun cuisine. Traditional Cajun and New Orleans Creole-influenced desserts are common.

Other game meats
Alligator
Alligator gar, or gator gar
Frog, usually bullfrogs (not just the legs, but the entire creature)
Gros bec, commonly called night heron
Nutria
Squirrel
Rabbit
Skunk, or mouffette
Turtle
Snake
Virginia opossum, or sarigue
Venison

Seasonings

Basil
Bay leaf
Black pepper
Cayenne pepper
Chili pepper
Chervil
Chives
Cloves
Dried shrimp
Garlic
Green mint
Marjoram
Onion (bell pepper, onion, and celery used together are known as the "holy trinity" of Cajun cuisine)
Oregano
Parsley, flat leaf
Sage
Sassafras leaves (dried & ground into the spice known as filé for gumbo of the Choctaw)
Sugarcane, also cane syrup, brown sugar and molasses
Summer savory
Thyme

Thyme, sage, mint, marjoram, savory, and basil are considered sweet herbs. In Colonial times a herbes de Provence would be several sweet herbs tied up in a muslin.

Blended
"Creole/Cajun spice" blends such as Tony Chachere's are sometimes used in Cajun kitchens, but do not suit every cook's style because Creole- and Cajun-style seasoning is often achieved from scratch, even by taste.
Cajun seasonings consist of a blend of salt with a variety of spices, most common being cayenne pepper and garlic. The spicy heat comes from the cayenne pepper, while other flavors come from bell pepper, paprika, green onions, parsley and more.
Curry
Hot sauce, including Tabasco sauce, which by 1885 was well known in Louisiana and abroad.
Marinades made with olive oil, brown sugar, and citrus juices
Mushroom catsup
Persillade
Seafood boil mix
Various barbecue rubs similar to those in other states.
Vinegar seasoned with small, pickled, hot green peppers is a common condiment with many Cajun meals.
Walnut catsup
Worcestershire sauce

Cooking bases
Dark roux—Cajuns inherited roux from the French. However, unlike the French, theirs is made with oil or bacon fat and more lately with olive oil, and not normally with butter. It is used as a thickening agent, especially in gumbo and étouffée.
Preparation of a dark roux is probably the most involved or complicated procedure in Cajun cuisine, involving heating fat and flour very carefully, constantly stirring for about 15–45 minutes (depending on the color of the desired product), until the mixture has darkened in color and developed a nutty flavor. The temperature should not be too high, as a burnt roux renders a dish unpalatable. 
Light roux—The secret to making a good gumbo is pairing the roux with the protein. A dark roux, with its strong (dense) nutty flavor will completely overpower a simple seafood gumbo, but is the perfect complement to a gumbo using chicken, sausage, crawfish or alligator.
A light roux, on the other hand, is better suited for strictly seafood dishes and unsuitable for meat gumbos for the reason that it does not support the heavier meat flavor as well. Pairing roux with protein follows the same orthodox philosophy as pairing wine with protein.
Stocks: Cajun stocks are more heavily seasoned than Continental counterparts, and the shellfish stock sometimes made with shrimp and crawfish heads is unique to Cajun cuisine.
Fish stock and Court-bouillon
Shellfish stock
Chicken stock

Cajun dishes

Primary favorites

Boudin—a type of sausage made from pork, pork liver, rice, garlic, green onions and other spices. It is widely available by the link or pound from butcher shops. Boudin is typically stuffed in a natural casing and has a softer consistency than other, better-known sausage varieties. It is usually served with side dishes such as rice dressing, maque choux or bread. Boudin balls are commonly served in southern Louisiana restaurants and are made by taking the boudin out of the case and frying it in spherical form.

Gumbo—High on the list of favorites of Cajun cooking are the soups called gumbos. Contrary to non-Cajun or Continental beliefs, gumbo does not mean simply "everything in the pot". Gumbo exemplifies the influence of French, Spanish, African and Native American food cultures on Cajun cuisine. 

There are two theories as to the etymological origins of the name. "Some believe that gumbo gets its name from the Choctaw word for filé powder, kombo; others suggest it’s taken from the West African Bantu name for okra, ki ngombo." Both filé and okra can be used as thickening agents in gumbo. Historically, large amounts of filé were added directly to the pot when okra was out of season. While a distinction between filé gumbo and okra gumbo is still held by some, many people enjoy putting filé in okra gumbo simply as a flavoring. Regardless of which is the dominant thickener, filé is also provided at the table and added to taste.

Many claim that gumbo is a Cajun dish, but gumbo was established long before the Acadian arrival. 

Its early existence came via the early French Creole culture In New Orleans, Louisiana, where French, Spanish and Africans frequented and also influenced by later waves of Italian, German and Irish settlers.

The backbone of a gumbo is roux, as described above. Cajun gumbo typically favors darker roux, often approaching the color of chocolate or coffee beans. Since the starches in the flour break down more with longer cooking time, a dark roux has less thickening power than a lighter one. While the stovetop method is traditional, flour may also be dry-toasted in an oven for a fat-free roux, or a regular roux may be prepared in a microwave oven for a hands-off method. If the roux is for immediate use, the "trinity" may be sauteed in it, which stops the cooking process.

A classic gumbo is made with chicken and andouille, especially in the colder months, but the ingredients vary according to what is available. Seafood gumbos are also very popular in Cajun country.

Jambalaya—The only certain thing that can be said about jambalaya is that it contains rice, some sort of meat (often chicken, ham, sausage, or a combination), seafood (such as shrimp or crawfish), plus other items that may be available. Usually, it will include green peppers, onions, celery, tomatoes and hot chili peppers. This is also a great pre-Acadian dish, established by the Spanish in Louisiana. Jambalaya may be a tomato-rich New Orleans-style "red" jambalaya of Spanish Creole roots, or a Cajun-style "brown" jambalaya which draws its color and flavor from browned meat and caramelized onions. Historically, tomatoes were not as widely available in Acadiana as the area around New Orleans, but in modern times, both styles are popular across the state. Brown is the style served at the annual World Jambalaya Festival in Gonzales.

Rice and gravy—Rice and gravy dishes are a staple of Cajun cuisine  and is usually a brown gravy based on pan drippings, which are deglazed and simmered with extra seasonings and served over steamed or boiled rice. 

The dish is traditionally made from cheaper cuts of meat and cooked in a cast-iron pot, typically for an extended time period in order to let the tough cuts of meat become tender. Beef, pork, chicken or any of a large variety of game meats are used for its preparation. Popular local varieties include hamburger steak, smothered rabbit, turkey necks, and chicken fricassee.

Food as an event

Crawfish boil

The crawfish boil is a celebratory event where Cajuns boil crawfish, potatoes, onions and corn in large pots over propane cookers. Lemons and small muslin bags containing a mixture of bay leaves, mustard seeds, cayenne pepper, and other spices, commonly known as "crab boil" or "crawfish boil" are added to the water for seasoning. 

The results are then dumped onto large, newspaper-draped tables and in some areas covered in Creole/Cajun spice blends, such as REX, Zatarain's, Louisiana Fish Fry, or Tony Chachere's. Also, cocktail sauce, mayonnaise, and hot sauce are sometimes used. The seafood is scooped onto large trays or plates and eaten by hand. 

During times when crawfish are not abundant, shrimp and crabs are prepared and served in the same manner.

Attendees are encouraged to "suck the head" of a crawfish by separating the head from the abdomen of the crustacean and sucking out the fat and juices from the head.

Often, newcomers to the crawfish boil or those unfamiliar with the traditions are jokingly warned "not to eat the dead ones." This comes from the common belief that when live crawfish are boiled, their tails curl beneath themselves, but when dead crawfish are boiled, their tails are straight and limp.
Seafood boils with crabs and shrimp are also popular.

Family 

The traditional Cajun outdoor food event hosted by a farmer in the rural areas of the Acadiana. Family and friends of the farmer gather to socialize, play games, dance, drink, and have a copious meal consisting of hog and other dishes. Men have the task of slaughtering a hog, cutting it into usable parts, and cooking the main pork dishes while women have the task of making boudin.

Traditionally, a suckling pig was purchased for the event, but in modern , adult pigs are used.

Unlike the family , a hog is not butchered by the hosts and there are generally not as many guests or activities. The host and male guests have the task of roasting the pig (see pig roast) while female guests bring side dishes.

Rural Mardi Gras
The traditional Cajun Mardi Gras (see: Courir de Mardi Gras) is a Mardi Gras celebration in rural Cajun Parishes. The tradition originated in the 18th century with the Cajuns of Louisiana, but it was abandoned in the early 20th century because of unwelcome violence associated with the event. In the early 1950s the tradition was revived in Mamou in Evangeline Parish.

The event revolves around male maskers on horseback who ride into the countryside to collect food ingredients for the party later on. They entertain householders with Cajun music, dancing, and festive antics in return for the ingredients. The preferred ingredient is a live chicken in which the householder throws the chicken to allow the maskers to chase it down (symbolizing a hunt), but other ingredients include rice, sausage, vegetables, or frozen chicken. 

Unlike other Cajun events, men take no part in cooking the main course for the party, and women prepare the chicken and ingredients for the gumbo. Once the festivities begin, the Cajun community members eat and dance to Cajun music until midnight after which is the beginning of Lent.

Other dishes and sides

 Alligator meat
 Andouille sausage
 Boiled crawfish
 Boudin balls—Boudin sausage filling that is rolled into a ball, battered and deep fried, instead of being stuffed into pork casings.
 Brochette
 Creole rice
 Catfish (or redfish) court-bouillon
 Cochon de lait—suckling pig
 Couche couche (Creole corn mush)
 Crawfish bisque
 Crawfish étouffée
 Crawfish pie
 Dirty rice
 Étouffée
 Fried frog legs
 Gumbo z'herbes 
 Hog's head cheese
 Maque choux
 Pecan pralines
 Pepper jelly
 Potato salad—generally made with egg, potato, celery, onions, mayonnaise, mustard and sometimes bell pepper
 Seafood-stuffed mirliton
 Tarte à la Bouillie—sweet-dough custard tarts
 Tasso ham

List of Cajun-influenced chefs

 Frank Joseph Davis
 John Folse
 Emeril Lagasse
 Paul Prudhomme
 Justin Wilson
 Isaac Toups

In popular culture 

Three popular local dishes in Acadiana are noted in the Hank Williams song "Jambalaya", namely "Jambalaya and-a crawfish pie and filé gumbo".

See also 
 Cuisine of New Orleans
 Cuisine of the United States
 List of festivals in Louisiana
 Louisiana Creole cuisine
Acadian cuisine

References

External links 

 
American cuisine by ethnic group